Franklin Battlefield was the site of the Second Battle of Franklin, which occurred late in the American Civil War. It is located in the southern part of Franklin, Tennessee, on U.S. 31. It was declared a National Historic Landmark in 1960.

The Carter House, which stands today and is open to visitors, was located at the center of the Union position. The house and outbuildings still show hundreds of bullet holes. Across the street from the Carter house, the Lotz House was similarly damaged, and the Lotz family huddled in the Carter House basement while the battle raged above. The  Carnton Plantation, home to the McGavock family during the battle, also still stands and is likewise open to the public. Confederate soldiers swept past Carnton toward the left wing of the Union army, and the house and outbuildings were converted into the largest field hospital present after the battle. Adjacent to Carnton is the McGavock Confederate Cemetery, where 1,481 Southern soldiers killed in the battle are buried.

Adjacent to the  surrounding Carnton is another  of battlefield, which is currently being converted to a city park. Much of the rest of the Franklin battlefield has been lost to commercial development. The spot where Gen. Patrick Cleburne fell, for instance, was covered until late 2005 by a Pizza Hut restaurant. Although the restaurant was purchased by a preservation group and demolished, the Civil War Preservation Trust continues to rank the Franklin battlefield as one of the ten most endangered sites. City officials and historic-preservation groups have recently placed a new emphasis on saving what remains of the land over which this terrible battle raged.

Fort Granger is preserved in a  section that is listed on the National Register of Historic Places.

The battlefield is now preserved as part of the  Eastern Flank Battle Park, which is operated by the city of Franklin.

See also
List of National Historic Landmarks in Tennessee
National Register of Historic Places listings in Williamson County, Tennessee

References

External links
Eastern Flank Battle Park - City of Franklin
Battle of Franklin, November 30, 1864

National Historic Landmarks in Tennessee
Historic American Buildings Survey in Tennessee
Historic American Landscapes Survey in Tennessee
Franklin, Tennessee
Battlefields of the Western Theater of the American Civil War
Parks in Tennessee
Protected areas of Williamson County, Tennessee
Historic districts on the National Register of Historic Places in Tennessee
Conflict sites on the National Register of Historic Places in Tennessee
Tennessee in the American Civil War
National Register of Historic Places in Williamson County, Tennessee